The Elk River is a large stream in the North Carolina High Country and East Tennessee.  The headwaters begin from the Northwestern slopes of Peak Mountain in Avery County, North Carolina and end at the Watauga River in Carter County, Tennessee.

Hydrography
With the headwaters beginning from the Northwestern slopes of Peak Mountain, it flows west to Banner Elk then towards Elk Park.  For most of the river's course, it runs in a deep gorge.  Just before the Elk River crosses into Tennessee it flows over "Big Falls" (also called "Elk Falls"), a locally-known attraction which is approximately a 60-foot (18 m) drop.  It then flows down a narrow, relatively steep valley to the tiny community of Elk Mills, which is named for a former water-powered mill built on this river at this point by early white settlers.  Between the state line and Elk Mills, it flows over Twisting Falls, a drop of approximately 30 feet (nine m).  At this point, it is bridged by U.S. Highway 321.  Shortly below this point, its waters become slack as part of an embayment of Watauga Lake, a sizable reservoir of the Watauga Dam Project of the Tennessee Valley Authority. This project has flooded the actual site of the original confluence of the Elk and Watauga rivers.

The water eventually flows through the Watauga River, the Holston River, the Tennessee River, the Ohio River, and the Mississippi River to the Gulf of Mexico.

For more information on waterfalls in the Elk River drainage, see Waterfalls of Tennessee by Gregory Plumb,

See also
List of North Carolina rivers
List of Tennessee rivers

References

Tributaries of the Watauga River
Rivers of North Carolina
Rivers of Tennessee
Rivers of Avery County, North Carolina
Rivers of Carter County, Tennessee